José González Díez, O.P. (11 November 1566 – 28 March 1631) was a Roman Catholic prelate who served as Archbishop of Burgos (1630–1631), Archbishop of Santiago de Compostela (1627–1630), Bishop of Pamplona (1625–1627), and Bishop of Palencia (1616–1625).

Biography
José González Díez was born in Villadiezma, Spain and ordained a priest in the Order of Preachers.
On 29 February 1616, he was appointed during the papacy of Pope Paul V as Bishop of Palencia.
In April 1616, he was consecrated bishop by Fernando Acevedo González, Archbishop of Burgos. 
On 30 March 1625, he was selected by the King of Spain and confirmed by Pope Urban VIII on 28 July 1625 as Bishop of Pamplona.
On 14 January 1627, he was selected by the King of Spain and confirmed by Pope Urban VIII on 17 May 1627 as Archbishop of Santiago de Compostela.
On 12 August 1630, he was appointed during the papacy of Pope Urban VIII as Archbishop of Burgos.
He served as Archbishop of Burgos until his death on 28 March 1631.

References

External links and additional sources
 (for Chronology of Bishops) 
 (for Chronology of Bishops) 
 (for Chronology of Bishops) 
 (for Chronology of Bishops) 
 (for Chronology of Bishops) 
 (for Chronology of Bishops) 

17th-century Roman Catholic archbishops in Spain
Bishops appointed by Pope Paul V
Bishops appointed by Pope Urban VIII
1566 births
1631 deaths